Daniel Boone; or, Pioneer Days in America is a 1907 American silent film directed by Wallace McCutcheon and Edwin S. Porter for the Edison Manufacturing Company. It starred Florence Lawrence, often called "the first movie star."

Plot
Boone's daughter befriends an Indian maiden as Boone and his companion start out on a hunting expedition. While he is away, Boone's cabin is attacked by the Indians, who set it on fire and abduct Boone's daughter. Boone returns, swears vengeance, then heads out on the trail to the Indian camp. His daughter escapes but is chased. The Indians encounter Boone, which sets off a huge fight on the edge of a cliff. A burning arrow gets shot into the Indian camp. Boone gets tied to the stake and tortured. The burning arrow sets the Indian camp on fire, causing panic. Boone is rescued by his horse, and Boone has a knife fight in which he kills the Indian chief.

Cast
William Craven as Daniel Boone
Florence Lawrence as Boone's daughter
Susanne Willis
Mrs. William Craven

Production and release
Film historian Charles Musser writes that the production was haphazardly shot in Bronx Park as weather and talent schedules permitted. Florence Lawrence kept notes of her first experiences in the film, which show that Porter did not delegate much of the work, which led to a slow shooting schedule.

References

External links

American silent short films
1907 films
Cultural depictions of Daniel Boone
Films directed by Edwin S. Porter
American black-and-white films
1900s American films